, also known internationally as La Maison de Himiko, is a 2005 Japanese film directed by Isshin Inudo  and starring Kō Shibasaki as Saori, Min Tanaka as Saori's father Himiko, and Joe Odagiri as Haruhiko, Himiko's lover. The film was shown at the Japanese film festival in Sydney in December 2006 (as La Maison de Himiko).

Plot
Saori is a young woman struggling to make her way in life. Her gay father, Himiko, had abandoned Saori and her mother years before. Now her father's young lover Haruhiko shows up to tell Saori that her father is dying of cancer. Still angry with her father but in need of money, Saori travels to the House of Himiko, a nursing home established by her father for gay men. Over time, a tenuous relationship begins to develop between Saori, her father, and Haruhiko.

Cast
 Jō Odagiri as Haruhiko
 Ko Shibasaki as Saori
 Min Tanaka as Tanaka
 Hidetoshi Nishijima as Hosokawa
 Torauemon Utazawa as Ruby
 Kira Aoyama as Yamazaki

Reception
In 2007, the film won the Nippon Cinema Award at the Nippon Connection Film Festival.

References

External links
Official Website

 

2005 films
2005 drama films
2000s Japanese-language films
Japanese LGBT-related films
LGBT-related drama films
Gay-related films
Films directed by Isshin Inudo
Japanese drama films
2005 LGBT-related films
2000s Japanese films